Stuart Alderson (born 15 August 1948 in Bishop Auckland, England) is an English former footballer.

Notes

1948 births
English footballers
Association football wingers
Living people
Newcastle United F.C. players
York City F.C. players
Ashington A.F.C. players
Sportspeople from Bishop Auckland
Footballers from County Durham
English Football League players